Lynedoch is a village in Norfolk County, Ontario, Canada and was named after Baron Lynedoch who served under Lord Wellington during the War of 1812.

Lynedoch is located northwest of Pine Grove, southwest of Delhi, and west of Simcoe.

History
Lynedoch's earliest known inhabitants, from around 1000-1350 AD, were the Algonquin nation. They were noted flint-workers and evidence of their skill in crafting arrowheads is still to be found in open worked field areas surrounding the village. The next wave of inhabitants were the Attawandaron nation, the Neutrals, who occupied the region from about 1350 until their absorption by the Iroquois in the year 1651. The last significant native nation to occupy the area was the Mississaugas.

During the 19th century, this hamlet had a post office, a school, tailor’s and blacksmith shops, taverns, hotels, and churches.

Industry
Agriculture is the main industry in the community. Residents can purchase Dennis' Horseradish from the Jason Ryder family farm just five minutes' driving distance to the east; they are a third-generation agriculture family in the area.

A quaint church and bank were moved to Cranberry Creek Gardens in Lynedoch for preservation and restoration. The site is now used as an event venue, hosting outdoor weddings, garden parties, concerts and wedding receptions.

Theoretical Effects from Catastrophic Climate Change
The winter of 1975 was the only unusually mild winter in the region from 1897 to 1977. From the late 1990s onwards, mild winters became a more common thing due to changes in the Earth's climate zones.

The warmest summers that Lynedoch has witnessed occurred in 1998, 2003, 2005, 2006, 2007, 2009 (with the exception of the month of July), 2010, 2012, 2013, 2014, 2015 and 2016.

However, it may be affected by droughts as a by-product of the dislocation of available fresh water and may be forced to rely on desalinated salt water piped in from the Eastern United States. Constructing the proper infrastructure to carry the water hundreds of miles away would take considerable manpower along with significant economic costs and an unprecedented level of cooperation from multiple federal, state/provincial, and municipal governments.

References

Communities in Norfolk County, Ontario